USS Industry (AMc-86) was an Accentor-class coastal minesweeper acquired by the U.S. Navy for the dangerous task of removing mines from minefields laid in the water to prevent ships from passing.

Industry was laid down 11 May 1941 by Fulton Shipyard, Antioch, California; launched 6 September 1941; sponsored by Miss June Marken; and placed in service 19 December 1941.

World War II service 

Following shakedown training, the wooden-hulled minesweeper sailed for Hawaii, arriving Pearl Harbor 11 March 1942. For more than 2 years the ship swept the channels of Pearl Harbor and Honolulu Harbor. As the Pacific Ocean war neared its climax in late 1944, the need for mine locator vessels became acute, and Industry's sweeping equipment was replaced by sound gear and diving equipment for underwater locator work.

Pacific Ocean operations 

Industry and two other converted minesweepers departed Pearl Harbor 1 May 1945 and, after stops at Eniwetok, Guam and Saipan, arrived off Okinawa 4 July. There she located and raised mines and sunken Japanese midget submarines during the months that followed.

Fighting off air attacks and typhoons 

The ship fought off enemy air raids in July and August, and in September endured a major typhoon. The ship was scheduled to depart for Japan in early October, but her departure was delayed by another typhoon, this one ranking with the most powerful in the recent history of Okinawa.

Wrecked in a typhoon 

In the violent storm in Buckner Bay 9 October, Industry drove ashore on a reef. Her crew kept her afloat until rescue came next morning.

Decommissioning 

The battered minesweeper was finally stripped and decommissioned 22 December 1945. The remaining hulk was sunk.

References

External links 
 NavSource Online: Mine Warfare Vessel Photo Archive - Industry (AMc 86)

 

Accentor-class minesweepers
Ships built in Antioch, California
1941 ships
World War II minesweepers of the United States
Maritime incidents in October 1945
Maritime incidents in December 1945
Shipwrecks in the Pacific Ocean